The enzyme dGTPase (EC 3.1.5.1) catalyzes the reaction

dGTP + H2O  deoxyguanosine + triphosphate

This enzyme belongs to the family of hydrolases, specifically those acting on triphosphoric monoester bonds.  The systematic name is dGTP triphosphohydrolase. Other names in common use include deoxy-GTPase, deoxyguanosine 5-triphosphate triphosphohydrolase, deoxyguanosine triphosphatase, and deoxyguanosine triphosphate triphosphohydrolase.  This enzyme participates in purine metabolism.

Structural studies

References

EC 3.1.5
Enzymes of known structure